The 1993–94 Honduran Liga Nacional season was the 28th edition of the Honduran Liga Nacional.  The format of the tournament consisted of a three round-robin schedule followed by a 6-team playoff round.  Real C.D. España won the title after winning the regular season and the final round and qualified to the 1995 CONCACAF Champions' Cup along with runners-up C.D. Motagua.

1993–94 teams

 Deportes Progreseño (promoted)
 Marathón
 Motagua
 Olimpia
 Petrotela
 Platense
 Real España
 Real Maya
 Victoria
 Vida

Regular season

Standings

Final round

Hexagonal

 Real España won 5–1 on aggregated.

 Motagua won 2–1 on aggregated.

 Vida won 5–3 on aggregated.

Triangular standings

Top scorer
  Alex Pineda Chacón (Olimpia) with 12 goals

Squads

Known results

Week 1

Week 6

Triangular

Unknown rounds

References

Liga Nacional de Fútbol Profesional de Honduras seasons
1993–94 in Honduran football
Honduras